Agyneta yulungiensis is a species of sheet weaver found in Nepal. It was described by Wunderlich in 1983.

References

yulungiensis
Arthropods of Nepal
Spiders of Asia
Spiders described in 1983